Ramsay Health Care Limited is an Australian multinational healthcare provider and hospital network, founded by Paul Ramsay in Sydney, Australia, in 1964. The company operates in Australia, Europe, the UK, and Asia, specialising in surgery, rehabilitation and psychiatric care.

Ramsay Australia
Ramsay Australia is the largest private provider of hospitals in Australia with more than 100 health facilities in operation.

Hospitals and facilities run by Ramsay 
 New South Wales
 Albury Wodonga Private Hospital, West Albury
 Armidale Private Hospital, Armidale
 Ballina Day Surgery, Ballina
 Baringa Private Hospital, Coffs Harbour
 Berkeley Vale Private Hospital, Berkeley Vale
 Castlecrag Private Hospital, Castlecrag
 Coolenberg Day Surgery, Port Macquarie 
 Dudley Private Hospital, Orange
 Figtree Private Hospital, Figtree
 Hunters Hill Private Hospital, Hunters Hill
 Kareena Private Hospital, Caringbah
 Kingsway Day Surgery, Miranda
 Lake Macquarie Private Hospital, Gateshead
 Lawrence Hargrave Private Hospital, Thirroul
 Mt Wilga Private Hospital, Hornsby (see Mount Wilga House)
 North Shore Private Hospital, St Leonards
 Northside Group
 St Leonards Clinic, St Leonards
 Cremorne Clinic, Cremorne
 Macarthur Clinic, Campbelltown
 Wentworthville Clinic, Wentworthville
 Nowra Private Hospital, Nowra
 Port Macquarie Private Hospital, Port Macquarie
 Southern Highlands Private Hospital, Bowral
 St George Private Hospital, Kogarah
 Strathfield Private Hospital, Strathfield
 Tamara Private Hospital, Tamworth
 The Border Cancer Hospital, Albury
 Warners Bay Private Hospital, Warners Bay
 Western Sydney Oncology, Westmead
 Westmead Private Hospital, Westmead
 Wollongong Private Hospital, Wollongong
 Queensland
 Caboolture Private Hospital, Caboolture
 Cairns Day Surgery, Cairns
 Cairns Private Hospital, Cairns
 Caloundra Private Hospital, Caloundra
 Greenslopes Private Hospital, Greenslopes
 Hillcrest Rockhampton Private Hospital, Rockhampton
 John Flynn Private Hospital, Tugun
 Nambour Selangor Private Hospital, Nambour
 New Farm Clinic, New Farm
 Noosa Hospital, Noosaville
 North West Private Hospital, Everton Park
 Pindara Day Surgery, Benowa
 Pindara Private Hospital, Benowa
 Short Street Day Surgery, Southport
 Southport Private Hospital, Southport
 St Andrew's Ipswich Private Hospital, Ipswich
 Sunshine Coast University Private Hospital, Birtinya
 The Cairns Clinic, Cairns
 South Australia
 Adelaide Clinic, Gilberton
 Kahlyn Day Centre, Magill
 Victoria
 Albert Road Clinic, Melbourne
 Beleura Private Hospital, Mornington
 Donvale Rehabilitation Hospital, Donvale
 Frances Perry House, Parkville
 Glenferrie Private Hospital, Hawthorn
 Linacre Private Hospital, Hampton
 Masada Private Hospital, St Kilda East
 Mitcham Private Hospital, Mitcham
 Murray Valley Private Hospital, Wodonga
 Peninsula Private Hospital, Frankston
 Shepparton Private Hospital, Shepparton
 The Avenue Hospital, Windsor
 Warringal Private Hospital, Heidelberg
 Waverley Private Hospital, Mount Waverley
 Western Australia
 Attadale Rehabilitation Hospital, Attadale
 Glengarry Private Hospital, Duncraig
 Hollywood Private Hospital, Nedlands
 Joondalup Health Campus, Joondalup
 Joondalup Private Hospital, Joondalup
 Peel Health Campus, Mandurah
 The Hollywood Clinic, Nedlands

Ramsay Santé 
Ramsay Health Care first acquired hospitals in France in 2010 and together with its partner Crédit Agricole Assurances, grew to a total of 40 hospitals across France, before acquiring a controlling interest in the market leader – Générale de Santé and its 75 facilities in 2014.

Ramsay Générale de Santé is the largest private hospital group in France with 121 facilities (110 hospitals) making it the market leader in that country.

Ramsay UK 
Ramsay Health Care UK - a network of 22 private UK hospitals, 9 treatment centres and 3 neurological units, offering a range of treatments from hip replacements to knee replacement surgery and cosmetic surgery to weight loss surgery.  It provides a number of Independent sector treatment centres for the English NHS. In 2007, Capio was acquired by Ramsay Health Care.

Ramsay Sime Darby
Paul Ramsay signed a joint venture in March 2013 with Malaysian conglomerate Sime Darby to combine Ramsay's three Indonesian hospitals with Sime's three in Malaysia, with plans to expand throughout Southeast Asia. The venture has since expanded to an additional day surgery in Hong Kong and a nursing college in Malaysia.

See also

Health care in Australia
Health care in the United Kingdom
Health care in Europe
Healthcare in Malaysia
Healthcare in Indonesia
List of hospitals in Australia

References

External links
 
 Ramsay Health Care UK Website
 Ramsay Générale de Santé website

Companies based in Sydney
Companies listed on the Australian Securities Exchange 
Private providers of NHS services
Health care companies established in 1964
Health care companies of Australia
Australian companies established in 1964